How to Lose a Wife and Find a Lover is a 1978 Italian comedy film directed by Pasquale Festa Campanile.

Cast 

 Johnny Dorelli as Dr. Alberto Castelli 
 Barbara Bouchet as Eleonora Rubens 
 Carlo Bagno as Anselmo 
 Toni Ucci as Brother Francesco 
 Felice Andreasi as Dr. Rossini 
 Enzo Cannavale as The Guru 
 Elsa Vazzoler as Anita  
 Stefania Casini as Marisa

References

External links

1978 films
Italian comedy films
1978 comedy films
Films directed by Pasquale Festa Campanile
Italian films based on plays
Films scored by Gianni Ferrio
Films set in Rome
Films set in Lombardy
Films shot in Rome
1970s Italian films